The  1977-78 French Rugby Union Championship was won by  Béziers   beating Montferrand in the final.

Formula 
The "elite"  (group A) were formed by five pools of eight clubs.

Were 25 the teams of group A qualified for the knockout stages with seven team coming from group B, also formed by 40 teams.

Both group were arranged in 5 pools of 8 teams.

Qualification Round

Group A 
In bold the clubs qualified for the next round. The teams are listed according to the final ranking

Group B 
The teams qualified are here listed:

Knockout stage

"Last 32" 
In bold the clubs qualified for the next round

"Last 16" 
In bold the clubs qualified for the next round

Quarter of finals 
In bold the clubs qualified for the next round

Semifinals

Final

External links
 Compte rendu finale de 1978 lnr.fr

1978
France
Championship